Deian Verón (born 25 September 2000) is an Argentine professional footballer who plays as a midfielder for Central Córdoba SdE on loan from Estudiantes LP.

Career
Verón began in Estudiantes' academy, he made his reserves debut on 24 November 2017 versus Atlético Tucumán under Leandro Benítez. He was promoted into Ricardo Zielinski's first-team in January 2021 and was assigned shirt number 11; the same number his father and grandfather wore for the club. He initially appeared on the substitute's bench for Copa de la Liga Profesional matches against River Plate, Godoy Cruz and Racing Club. Aged twenty, Verón made his senior debut on 7 March during a 5–0 win in the Copa de la Liga away to Arsenal de Sarandí; he replaced Juan Sánchez Miño off the bench.

In January 2022, Verón was loaned out to Central Córdoba SdE until the end of 2022.
On 14 July 2022, he scored his first goal in the first division of Argentina.

Personal life
Verón comes from a footballing family. His father (Juan Sebastián), uncle (Iani), grandfather (Juan Ramón) and great-uncle (Pedro Verde) all played professional football.

Career statistics
.

References

External links

2000 births
Living people
Footballers from La Plata
Argentine footballers
Association football midfielders
Verón/Verde family
Argentine Primera División players
Estudiantes de La Plata footballers
Central Córdoba de Santiago del Estero footballers